Wayne McDaniel is an American former professional basketball player. He spent much of his career in the Australian National Basketball League (NBL), playing 288 games from 1983 to 1994. He scored over 7,600 points in his career at an average of 26.5 points per game over twelve seasons with 4 teams. He was a four-time NBL All-Star.

Born in San Francisco, California, McDaniel played college basketball for the Cal State Bakersfield Roadrunners from 1980 to 1982. He played professionally for the Adelaide 36ers (1983), Geelong Supercats (1984–1985), Newcastle Falcons (1986–1988) and Hobart Devils (1989–1994) of the NBL. Setting many single-game and single-season records, he retired in 1995.

As of the 2013–14 NBL season, Wayne McDaniel sits 3rd on the NBL's highest career points average with 26.5 per game, 3rd in career 40+ point games (22), 2nd in career 30+ point season averages (4), 9th in field goals made in a single game (24 vs Adelaide 36ers in 1989), and 10th in most points in a single game with 57 vs Adelaide in 1989.

He has also appeared in films such as Son of the Mask (2005) and Superman Returns (2006) and The Sapphires (2012). In November, 2014, McDaniel appeared in the world premiere production of the rock musical, The Island of Doctor Moron, playing the role of Brother Bob.

See also
NBL (Australia) 25th Anniversary Team
NBL (Australia) All-time Records

Notes

External links
Player statistics for Wayne Mcdaniel - SportingPulse

Year of birth missing (living people)
Living people
Adelaide 36ers players
American expatriate basketball people in Australia
American men's basketball players
Basketball players from San Francisco
Cal State Bakersfield Roadrunners men's basketball players
City College of San Francisco Rams men's basketball players
Hobart Devils players